1.1.1.1 is a free Domain Name System (DNS) service by the American company Cloudflare in partnership with APNIC. The service functions as a recursive name server, providing domain name resolution for any host on the Internet. The service was announced on April 1, 2018. On November 11, 2018, Cloudflare announced a mobile application of their 1.1.1.1 service for Android and iOS. On September 25, 2019, Cloudflare released WARP, an upgraded version of their original 1.1.1.1 mobile application.

Service 
The 1.1.1.1 DNS service operates recursive name servers for public use at the twelve IP addresses listed below. These addresses are mapped to the nearest operational server by anycast routing. The DNS service is also available for Tor clients. Users can set up the service by manually changing their DNS resolvers to the IP addresses below. Mobile users on both Android and iPhone have the alternative of downloading the 1.1.1.1 mobile application, which automatically configures the DNS resolvers on the device.

DNS64 
1.1.1.1 supports recursive DNS service for IPv6-only networks with use of NAT64.

Technology 
1.1.1.1 is a recursive DNS resolver. Cloudflare runs an authoritative DNS resolver with a network of over 20 million Internet properties. With the recursor and the resolver on the same network, some DNS queries can be answered directly.

With the release of the 1.1.1.1 mobile application in November 2018, Cloudflare added the ability for users to encrypt their DNS queries over HTTPS (DoH) or TLS (DoT). Later on, a VPN tunnel was implemented based on Cloudflare's own BoringTun, a user space implementation of WireGuard written in Rust.

Prior usage of the IP address 
Technology websites noted that by using  as the IP address for its service, Cloudflare exposed misconfigurations in existing setups that violated Internet standards (such as RFC1918).  was not a reserved IP address, yet was abused by many existing routers (mostly those sold by Cisco Systems) and companies for hosting login pages to private networks, exit pages or other purposes, rendering the proper routing of  impossible on those systems. Additionally,  is blocked on many networks and by multiple ISPs because the simplicity of the address means that it was previously often used inappropriately for testing purposes and not legitimate use. These previous uses have led to a huge influx of garbage data to Cloudflare's servers.

The  IP block was assigned in 2010 to APNIC; before this time it was unassigned space. An unassigned IP space, however is not the same as a reserved IP space for private use (called a reserved IP address). For example, AT&T has said it is working on fixing this issue within its CPE hardware.

WARP 
In September 2019, Cloudflare released a VPN service called WARP which is built into the 1.1.1.1 mobile app. WARP is built around the WireGuard protocol. It replaces the connection between your device and the internet, however, WARP is not a traditional VPN and will not allow you to access geo-restricted content.

WARP+ 
WARP+ routes your internet traffic into less congested pathways using Cloudflare's own private backbone called Argo, which makes it much faster than basic WARP. WARP+ is a limited data plan, to get more data to use WARP+ you must refer more people to use the service.

WARP+ Unlimited 
WARP+ Unlimited is a paid monthly subscription service to secure more data to use for WARP+ without any data limits.

See also 
 DNS over HTTPS
 DNS over TLS
 Public recursive name server
 IPv4 and IPv6

References

External links 
 
 The Cloudflare Blog
 Cloudflare Docs: Setting up 1.1.1.1
 Cloudflare Docs: 1.1.1.1 Public DNS Resolver

 
 

Alternative Internet DNS services
Internet properties established in 2018
IP addresses
Cloudflare